Hauglid may refer to:
Brian M. Hauglid, American historian
Ranja Hauglid, Norwegian politician
Roar Hauglid, Norwegian historian